Heine is a surname and a given name.

Heine may also refer to:

 Heine (crater), a crater on Mercury
 Mount Heine, a hill on White Island, Ross Archipelago, Antarctica
 Heine, German name for Kolejka, Opole Voivodeship, a village in Poland

See also
 Heine Brothers', an American chain of coffee shops
 Heine Optotechnik, a German manufacturer of medical diagnostic instruments
 Heine Prize, three different German awards in honor of Heinrich Heine
 Heine-Velox, a large luxury car made in the early 20th century